Micah Scott Neal (born November 8, 1974) is a businessman and politician. Neal represented part of Springdale in the Arkansas House of Representatives from 2013 until 2017. From 2003 to 2011, he was a justice of the peace on the Washington County quorum court. He pleaded guilty in 2017 to fraud relating to misuse of the state's surplus money.

Bribery
On January 4, 2017, Neal pled guilty to conspiring to direct $600,000 in state government funds to Ecclesia College and another non-profit organization in exchange for $38,000 in bribes. He was found guilty and sentenced to one year of home confinement, two years probation, 300 hours of community service and restitution of $200,000.

The plea agreement also singled out the president of the college—Oren Paris III—for direct involvement with the conspiracy. Paris stated that "neither I nor anyone associated with Ecclesia College has ever participated or engaged in any activity to provide money to Mr. Neal or any other legislator in exchange for the receipt of those funds."

Also indicted in the case is former state Senator Jon Woods of Springdale and Randell Shelton, Jr., of Alma in Crawford County, Arkansas.

References

 

1974 births
Living people
21st-century American criminals
American fraudsters
American politicians convicted of bribery
Arkansas politicians convicted of crimes
People from Springdale, Arkansas
University of Arkansas alumni
Businesspeople from Arkansas
Republican Party members of the Arkansas House of Representatives
County justices of the peace in Arkansas
Baptists from Arkansas
21st-century American politicians